Pulman is a surname. Notable people with the surname include:

 Cory Pulman (born 1963), English actress now known by her married name Cory Pulman-Jones
 Doug Pulman (1946–2011), New Zealand rower
 Elizabeth Pulman (1836–1900), New Zealand photographer
 Felicity Pulman (born 1945), Australian author
 George Pulman (1819–1880), English journalist
 Jack Pulman (1929–1979), English television screenwriter
 James Pulman (1783–1859), English officer of arms
 James Heard Pulman (1821–1900), House of Lords Librarian
 John Pulman (1923–1998), English professional snooker player
 Liza Pulman, English singer and actress

Other uses
 Pulman Challenge Cup, a Gentlemen's Single Sculls rowing event at the Skiff Championships Regatta on the Thames

See also
 Pullman (disambiguation)